Moore Nature Reserve is a nature reserve in the village of Moore in Halton, Cheshire, England.

History

The 200-acre reserve lies alongside the Manchester Ship Canal and is bisected by the de-watered course of the Runcorn to Latchford Canal. Prior to becoming a nature reserve it was used as farmland and for sand quarrying. The land is owned by Peel Holdings, who have it licensed as a landfill site and only protected until 2021. Part of the reserve has been registered to be used in the expansion of Port Warrington.

Facilities
It is managed by wardens employed by FCC Environment, operators of nearby Arpley Landfill site. The landfill no longer accepts waste and is being restored to a mix of woodland and grassland and, together with Moore Nature Reserve, will eventually provide an important public amenity and area of rich biodiversity on the edge of what is a busy, and growing urban area. Access is made freely available to the public and there are maintained footpaths around the reserve.

Bird watching
There are five lakes, woodland, meadows, bird feeding stations and nine bird hides covering the lakes. The RSPB state that is one of the best in Cheshire for bird spotting, noting that it hosts all three species of woodpecker including the lesser spotted woodpeckers and five species of British owls including tawny owls.

See also
List of parks and open spaces in Cheshire

References

Nature reserves in Cheshire
Lakes and reservoirs of Cheshire
Lakes of Cheshire